Hilal-e-Pakistan is the second-highest civil award (in the hierarchy of "Hilal") of the Islamic Republic of Pakistan. The award seeks to recognize those people who have made "meritorious contribution to the national interests of Pakistan, or cultural, social contribution, or other significant public or private endeavors". The award is not limited to Pakistani citizens. While it is a civilian award, it can also be conferred upon foreign nationals. It is bestowed by the president of Pakistan once a year on the eve of Independence day.

History 
Hilal-e-Pakistan and other civil awards came into existence following the independence of Pakistan on March 23, 1956. However, civil awards including Hilal-e-Pakistan were established on March 19, 1957 under the article 259(2) of the Constitution of Pakistan and Decorations Act, 1975. Hilal-e-Pakistan, the second-highest civil award was possibly first conferred upon Chief justice of Dhaka high court, Amin Ahmed.

Policy
President of Pakistan confers civil awards under the
Article 259(2) of the constitution-1973 and decorations Article-1975 in recognition of meritorious contribution and selfless devotion.

Previous Versions of Hilal-e-Pakistan

Notable recipients

Controversies 
President Asif Ali Zardari was accused in 2011 for conferring 185 civil awards including Hilal-e-Pakistan, to its federal Cabinet ministers and foreigners. Pakistan News media in 2011, covered reports stating that its former prime minister Zulfiqar Ali Bhutto including Benazir Bhutto were restricted during their tenure from bestowing the civil awards to associates.

See also 
Civil decorations of Pakistan
Awards and decorations of the Pakistan Armed Forces

References 

Civil awards and decorations of Pakistan
Awards established in 1957
1957 establishments in Pakistan